Jeremy Schonbrunner (born September 12, 1989) is an American football offensive lineman who is currently a free agent. He played college football at Temple University and attended Wicomico High School in Salisbury, Maryland. He has also been a member of the Lehigh Valley Steelhawks, San Antonio Talons, Trenton Freedom and Tampa Bay Storm.

College career
Schonbrunner played for the Temple Owls from 2007 to 2011. He was the team's starter his final year and helped the Owls to 9 wins. He played in 30 games during his career including 9 starts at center.

Professional career

Philadelphia Soul
On February 8, 2012, Schonbrunner was assigned to the Philadelphia Soul of the Arena Football League. He was placed on reassignment on March 1, 2012.

Lehigh Valley Steelhawks
On April 2, 2012, Schonbrunner signed with the Lehigh Valley Steelhawks of the Indoor Football League. On June 19, 2012, Schonbrunner was assigned to the Georgia Force, but his assignment was voided on June 21, 2012. On November 12, 2012, Schonbrunner re-signed with the Steelhawks for the 2013 season. On June 16, 2013, Schonbrunner was placed on the exempt list.

San Antonio Talons
On February 15, 2013, Schonbrunner was assigned to the San Antonio Talons. On March 16, 2013, he was placed on injured reserve. On May 17, 2013, he was placed on reassignment. Schonbrunner never appeared in a game for the Talons before returning to the Steelhawks

Trenton Freedom
Schonbrunner was signed by the Trenton Freedom for the 2014 season, but Schonbrunner was assigned to the Iowa Barnstormers and left the Freedom before playing in a single game.

Iowa Barnstormers
On February 5, 2014, Schonbrunner was assigned to the Iowa Barnstormers.

San Antonio Talons
On May 13, 2014, Schonbrunner was traded to the Talons for claim order position.

Trenton Freedom
Schonbrunner signed with the Freedom again for the 2015 season, but was placed on the exempt list before the season started.

Tampa Bay Storm
On October 14, 2014, Schonbrunner was assigned to the Tampa Bay Storm. On March 9, 2016, Schonbrunner was placed on suspension by the Storm. On April 25, 2016, Schonbrunner was placed on reassignment.

Iowa Barnstormers
On October 21, 2016, Schonbrunner signed with the Barnstormers.

Columbus Lions
On November 7, 2017, Schonbrunner signed with the Columbus Lions.

References

External links
Temple Owls profile

Living people
1989 births
Players of American football from Maryland
American football offensive linemen
Temple Owls football players
Lehigh Valley Steelhawks players
Iowa Barnstormers players
Trenton Freedom players
Tampa Bay Storm players
Columbus Lions players
People from Salisbury, Maryland